The Teșna is a left tributary of the river Dorna in Romania. It flows into the Dorna in Podu Coșnei.

References

Rivers of Romania
Rivers of Suceava County
Rivers of Bistrița-Năsăud County